Rhonda Dawn Sharp  (born 1953), is an adjunct professor of economics at the University of South Australia and project team leader and chief researcher of the university's Hawke Research Institute and Research Centre for Gender Studies.

In 2007 Sharp was an advisor to the UN Women's Expert Group Meeting (EGM): Financing for gender equality and the empowerment of women, and from 2000 to 2001 she was the president of the International Association for Feminist Economics (IAFFE).

Education 
Rhonda Sharp gained a degree in economics (1975) and a diploma in education (1976) from the University of New England, Australia. She went to the University of Queensland where she achieved her master of economics in 1982. In 1997 Sharp qualified in her doctorate at the University of Sydney.

Selected bibliography

See also 
 Feminist economics
 List of feminist economists

References

External links 
 Profile: Rhonda Sharp University of South Australia

1953 births
Australian economists
Australian women economists
Feminist economists
Living people
University of New England (Australia) alumni
University of Queensland alumni
Academic staff of the University of South Australia
University of Sydney alumni
Members of the Order of Australia
Presidents of the International Association for Feminist Economics